The term refers to the first occasion a Eucharistic celebration (a Mass) takes place. There are two natural contexts to its use:

Historical, which would be the first occasion where a Mass is celebrated in a particular place, such as the First Mass in the Philippines.
Personal, this term is used for the first occasion at which a newly ordained Catholic priest presides at a Mass. The term is also often used within the Anglican communion, particularly by Anglo-Catholics. While clearly a special moment in that man's life, particular blessings take place on this occasion. The term is likewise used in the Church of Sweden, with the same definition (the Latin term, Prima Missa, is most often used).

Catholic liturgy